Orlando de Carvalho Airport  is the airport serving Umuarama, Brazil.

It is operated by Infracea.

History
On January 25, 2022 Infracea won de concession to operate the airport.

Airlines and destinations

Access

See also

List of airports in Brazil

References

External links

Airports in Paraná (state)
Umuarama